,
The Great Love is a 1925 American silent comedy film directed by Marshall Neilan based upon his own story, scripted by Benjamin Glazer. The film stars Robert Agnew, Viola Dana, and ZaSu Pitts.

Plot
The story of the affection for an elephant, Norma.

Cast

Preservation
With no prints of The Great Love located in any film archives, it is a lost film.

References

External links

1925 films
Lost American films
Metro-Goldwyn-Mayer films
American silent feature films
American black-and-white films
1925 comedy films
Films directed by Marshall Neilan
Films about animals
Silent American comedy films
1925 lost films
Lost comedy films
1920s American films